Madonna di Loreto may refer to:

Our Lady of Loreto, the title of the Virgin Mary with respect to the Holy House of Loreto and the image displayed there
Madonna di Loreto (Caravaggio), a c. 1604–1606 painting
Madonna of Loreto, a c. 1511 painting by Raphael
Madonna of Loreto (Perugino), a c 1507 painting